Abyssicoccus is a genus from the family of Staphylococcaceae, with one known species (Abyssicoccus albus).

References

Erysipelotrichia
Monotypic bacteria genera
Bacteria genera